Sanda (stylized in all caps) is a Japanese manga series written and illustrated by Paru Itagaki. It has been serialized in Akita Shoten's shōnen manga magazine Weekly Shōnen Champion since July 2021, with its chapters collected in seven tankōbon volumes as of February 2023. The story takes place in the future, where the birth rate in Japan has been rapidly declining. The main character, Sanda Kazushige, is found to be the descendant of Santa Claus by his classmate, Shiori Fuyumura. Together, they attempt to find Fuyumura's missing classmate, Ono Ichie.

Synopsis

Setting
The story is set in Japan in 2080. Affected by the declining birth rate, Japan has implemented a series of control policies for minors, including arranging marriage partners from infancy, not allowing children to sleep to slow down development, and needing to use the toilet separately from adults. Young people's social status is also higher than adults. Santa Claus has been sealed for a long time because of the curse, which makes the society think that Santa Claus has disappeared, and regard Christmas as an ancient custom or fictional legend.

Plot
On December 25, when it was snowing, middle school student Sanda Kazushige's body seal was broken by his classmate Fuyumura Shiori, making him look like Santa Claus. Later, Sanda discovers that he can change back into his middle school form by eating jellybeans, or change into Santa form by wearing red. The reason why Fuyumura lifted the seal was that she hoped that Sanda would help find her missing classmate Ono Ichie, and also hoped that he would remind the society of Christmas.

Production
Before the release of Sanda, Paru Itagaki published a one-shot chapter, titled , in Nihon Bungeisha's seinen manga magazine Weekly Manga Goraku on September 7, 2018. The one-shot was about Santa Claus and a sex worker. Itakagi talked to her editor at Weekly Manga Goraku about wanting to make another series reusing the Santa Claus character, but targeting it towards younger readers. Her editor agreed on the condition that she would first make a one-volume manga for the publisher, which ended up being , whose collected volume was released in April 2021; Sanda started three months later in  Akita Shoten's shōnen manga magazine Weekly Shōnen Champion on July 21.

Publication
Sanda, written and illustrated by Paru Itagaki, started in Akita Shoten's shōnen manga magazine Weekly Shōnen Champion on July 21, 2021. Akita Shoten has collected its chapters into individual tankōbon volumes. The first volume was released on December 8, 2021. As of February 8, 2023, seven volumes have been released.

Volume list

References

External links
  

Akita Shoten manga
Santa Claus in fiction
Shōnen manga